This national electoral calendar for 2023 lists the national/federal elections held, and scheduled to be held, in 2023 in all sovereign states and their dependent territories. By-elections are excluded, though national referendums are included. Specific dates are given where these are known.

January
 8 January: Benin, National Assembly
 13–14 January: Czech Republic, President (1st round)
 18 January: Antigua and Barbuda, House of Representatives
 21 January: Slovakia, Constitutional referendum
 26 January: Tokelau, General Fono
 27–28 January: Czech Republic, President (2nd round)
 29 January:
 Liechtenstein, Constitutional referendum
 Tunisia,  Parliament (2nd round)

February
 5 February:
 Cyprus, President (1st round)
 Ecuador, Referendum
 Monaco, Parliament
 12 February: Cyprus, President (2nd round)
 24 February: Djibouti, National Assembly
 25 February: Nigeria, President, Senate and House of Representatives

March
 5 March: Estonia, Parliament
 7 March: Micronesia, Parliament
 19 March:
 Kazakhstan, Parliament
 Montenegro, President (1st round)
 26 March:
 Cuba, Parliament
 Turkmenistan, Parliament

April
 2 April:
 Andorra, Parliament
 Bulgaria, Parliament
 Finland, Parliament
 Montenegro, President (2nd round)
 16 April: French Polynesia, Assembly
 24 April: British Virgin Islands, Parliament
 30 April:
 Paraguay, President, Senate and Chamber of Deputies
 Uzbekistan, Constitutional referendum

May
 7 May:
 Chile, Constitutional Council
 Thailand, Parliament
 13–27 May: Mauritania, Parliament
 14 May: Turkey, President and Parliament
 21 May: East Timor, Parliament

June
 4 June: Guinea-Bissau, Parliament
 11 June: Montenegro, Parliament
 24 June: Sierra Leone, President and Parliament
 25 June: Guatemala, President and Parliament

July
 23 July: Cambodia, National Assembly

September
 9 September: Maldives, President
 30 September: Slovakia, Parliament

October
10 October: Liberia, President, Senate and House of Representatives
 14 October: New Zealand, House of Representatives
 22 October: Switzerland, Council of States and National Council
 29 October: Argentina, President, Senate and Chamber of Representatives

December
3 December: Spain, Parliament
 20 December: Democratic Republic of Congo, President and National Assembly

Unknown date
 Bhutan, National Assembly and National Council
 Eswatini, House of Assembly
 Gabon, President and Parliament
 Greece, Parliament
 Haiti, President, Senate, Chamber of Deputies and Constitutional Referendum
 Libya, President, Parliament and Constitutional Referendum
 Luxembourg, Chamber of Deputies 
 Madagascar, President
 Mali, Constitutional referendum
 Marshall Islands, Parliament
 Niue, Parliament
 Oman, Parliament
 Pakistan, National Assembly
 Poland, Parliament
 Rwanda, Parliament
 Singapore, President
 Solomon Islands, Parliament
 Togo, Parliament
 Tuvalu, Parliament
 Ukraine, Parliament
 Zimbabwe, President and National Assembly

Indirect elections
The following indirect elections of heads of state and the upper houses of bicameral legislatures are scheduled to take place through votes in elected lower houses, unicameral legislatures, or electoral colleges:

 14 January: Kazakhstan, Senate
 20 January: 
 Sahrawi Republic, President
 Trinidad and Tobago, President
 13 February: Bangladesh, President
 2 March: Vietnam, President
 9 March: Nepal, President
 10 March: China, President
 12 March: Cameroon, Senate
 11 May: Micronesia, President
 30 May: Netherlands, Senate
 31 May: Latvia, President
 Dominica, President
 France, Senate
 Ivory Coast, 
 Republic of the Congo,

References

National
Political timelines of the 2020s by year
National